Ronzo-Chienis (Rónž e Cianìs in local dialect) is a comune (municipality) in Trentino in the Italian region Trentino-Alto Adige/Südtirol, located about  southwest of Trento in the Val di Gresta.

Ronzo-Chienis borders the following municipalities: Arco, Villa Lagarina, Isera and Mori.

References

Cities and towns in Trentino-Alto Adige/Südtirol